Katha Kanchiki Manam Intiki (transl. The tale goes to Kanchi and we go home) is a 2022 Indian Telugu-language comedy horror film directed and written by Chanakya Chinna and produced by Monish Pathipati under the banner of MP Arts.The film stars Thrigun, Pujitha Ponnada, Mahesh Manjrekar and Vinod Kumar in the lead roles. and the film was released on April 8, 2022.

Plot 
'Katha Kanchiki Manam Intiki' is the story of four people from different stratum of society. Prem (Thrigun) is a young man who feels that there is no love in life and no marriage luck in his name. Daksha (Pujita Ponnada) is a girl who takes whatever risk is put for the purpose of the bet. Kannayya ('Getup' Sreenu) is a petty thief with a disability. Nandi ('Mirchi' R.J. Hemanth) is a writer. The four of them go to the cemetery one night for different reasons and introduce each other in fear. Then all four go to the bungalow next to the cemetery. What happens to these four people forms the crux of the story.

Cast 
Thrigun as Prem
Pujita Ponnada as Daksha
Mahesh Manjrekar
Vinod Kumar
R.J. Hemant
Getup Sreenu
Saptagiri
Shyamala
Sahiti

Soundtrack 

Bheems Ceciroleo scored the film's background music and Srinivasa Teja composed for its soundtrack, also writing lyrics for all track. The soundtrack album consists of 4 tracks.

Reception
A critic from The Times of India called the film "an engaging ride".

References

External links 
 

Films scored by Bheems Ceciroleo
2022 films
2020s Telugu-language films
Indian comedy horror films
2022 comedy horror films